Kyle Mangas (born April 8, 1999) is an American basketball player for BC Šiauliai of the Lithuanian Basketball League. He played college basketball for the Indiana Wesleyan Wildcats. In his junior season, he won the Bevo Francis Award and was named NABC NAIA Division II Player of the Year, and in his senior season was named Academic All-American of the Year in NAIA men's basketball.

Early life and high school career
Mangas grew up playing basketball under his father's coaching. He quit playing football after his sophomore year of high school to focus on basketball. Mangas played for Warsaw Community High School in Warsaw, Indiana, where he led his team to a 61–17 record over three seasons. As a senior, Mangas was named an Indiana All-Star and scored 47 points against East Chicago Central High School. He left Warsaw with 1,450 career points, the fourth-most in school history. Mangas chose to play college basketball for National Association of Intercollegiate Athletics (NAIA) Division II program Indiana Wesleyan in April 2017, in part because he "connected with the coach staff and players."

College career
As a freshman for Indiana Wesleyan, Mangas averaged 21.5 points, 5.2 rebounds and 2.9 assists per game, winning the 2018 NAIA Division II Tournament, where he was named Most Outstanding Player. He was recognized as Crossroads League Player of the Year, becoming the first freshman to win the award, and scored a single-season school-record 818 points. Mangas also earned NAIA Division II All-American First Team accolades. In his sophomore season, Mangas averaged 23.6 points, 5.0 rebounds and 3.8 assists per game, repeating as Crossroads League Player of the Year and being selected to the NAIA Division II All-American First Team. As a junior, he averaged 26.9 points, 6.4 rebounds and 4.2 assists per game, claiming the Bevo Francis Award and NABC NAIA Division II Player of the Year. For his third straight year, he was named Crossroads League Player of the Year and to the NAIA Division II All-American First Team. Mangas finished the season with the second-most points in the NAIA Division II and as Indiana Wesleyan's all-time leading scorer. As a senior, Mangas averaged 29.5 points, 7.4 rebounds, 5.1 assists and 1.9 steals per game. In 2021, he was named the Academic All-American of the Year in NAIA men's basketball.

Professional career
On September 1, 2021, Mangas signed his first professional contract with USK Praha of the Czech National Basketball League.

Personal life
Mangas' father, Tim, played basketball for Wawasee High School in Syracuse, Indiana, where he scored over 1,000 career points, before playing college basketball for DePauw University. His mother, Ann, also played for Wawasee and was a member of its 1985 state runner-up team. Mangas' older brother, Jake, played football and basketball for Warsaw High School. Mangas studied finance at Indiana Wesleyan.

References

External links
Indiana Wesleyan Wildcats bio

1999 births
Living people
American expatriate basketball people in the Czech Republic
American men's basketball players
Basketball players from Indiana
BC Šiauliai players
Indiana Wesleyan Wildcats men's basketball players
People from Warsaw, Indiana
Point guards
Shooting guards
USK Praha players